Philip Metres is an American writer (poet, translator, scholar, and essayist).

His poetry books include Shrapnel Maps, Pictures at an Exhibition, and Sand Opera. He has published poems, essays, and reviews in literary journals and magazines including Poetry, American Poetry Review, New England Review, Tin House, Ploughshares, New American Writing, Massachusetts Review, and others.  His work has been anthologized in Best American Poetry; The New American Poetry of Engagement; With Our Eyes Wide Open: Poems of the New American Century; A Face to Meet the Faces: An Anthology of Contemporary Persona Poetry (2011); I Go to the Ruined Place: Contemporary Poems in Defense of Global Human Rights (2009); and Inclined to Speak: Contemporary Arab American Poetry (2008).

Honors
Metres' honors include a Guggenheim Fellowship, Lannan Literary Fellowship, two National Endowment for the Arts Fellowships, three Arab American Book Awards in poetry, the George W. Hunt, S.J., Prize, a Creative Workforce Fellowship, seven Ohio Arts Council Individual Excellence Awards, the Beatrice Hawley Award, the Adrienne Rich Award for Poetry (2019), the Lyric Poetry Prize (2016), the Anne Halley Prize for best poem by Massachusetts Review (2012), the Cleveland Arts Prize (Emerging Artist) (2010), Jury Prize for To See the Earth (Lit's Literary Showcase, 2008), Twin Cranes Peace Poem Prize; "For the Fifty Who Formed PEACE with Their Bodies," and a National Endowment of the Arts fellowship (2001). His first book, Behind the Lines, received the International PeaceWriting Award. During his Thomas J. Watson Fellowship (1992–93), he began to translate contemporary Russian poetry, and he has since published numerous translations of the poetry of Sergey Gandlevsky, Lev Rubinstein, and Arseny Tarkovsky.

Life
After Metres received a B.A. magna cum laude from Holy Cross College, he went on to earn an M.A. (English), M.F.A. (poetry) and Ph.D. (English) at Indiana University at Bloomington.  He is currently a professor of English and Director of the Peace, Justice, and Human Rights program at John Carroll University and is core faculty at Vermont College of Fine Arts M.F.A. program. In 2019, Metres was a faculty member at the 2019 Conference on Poetry at The Frost Place. Metres teaches issues related to nonviolent resistance and peacebuilding in the United States, Middle East, and Northern Ireland.  Of Lebanese descent on his father's side, Metres plays a role in the Arab-American literary scene. Metres currently resides in Cleveland, Ohio with his wife, the award-winning writer Amy Breau, and their two daughters. His family of origin includes psychologists Kay Dannemann Metres (mother) and Phil Metres Jr. (father), entrepreneur Katherine Metres (sister), and attorney David Metres (brother).

Published works

Full-Length Poetry Collections (Original Poems and Translations)
Shrapnel Maps. Copper Canyon Press, 2020. 
Pictures at an Exhibition. Akron Poetry Series, 2016. , 
 Sand Opera. Alice James Books, 2015. , 
 I Burned at the Feast: Selected Poems of Arseny Tarkovsky. Cleveland State University Poetry Center, 2015. , 
 Compleat Catalogue of Comedic Novelties: Poems by Lev Rubinstein. Translation by Philip Metres and Tatiana Tulchinsky. Ugly Duckling Press, 2014.
 To See the Earth. Cleveland State University Poetry Center, 2008. , 
 Catalogue of Comedic Novelties: Selected Poems of Lev Rubinstein.  Translation by Philip Metres and Tatiana Tulchinsky.  New York: Ugly Duckling Presse, 2004. , 
 A Kindred Orphanhood: Selected Poems of Sergey Gandlevsky.  Translation by Philip Metres.  Boston, MA: Zephyr Press, 2003. ,

Criticism
The Sound of Listening: Poetry as Refuge and Resistance. Essays on Poetry. Ann Arbor, MI: University of Michigan Press. 2018. 
"Beyond Grief and Grievance: The poetry of 9/11 and its aftermath."  Poetry Foundation website.
 "Poems for Peace."  Poetry Foundation website.
 "By Ambush and Stratagem: Poems of War and Peace in the Age of Pure War." Oxford Handbook of Modern and Contemporary Poetry.  Ed. Cary Nelson.  New York: Oxford UP, 2011.
 "From Reznikoff to Public Enemy."   Poetry Foundation website.
 Behind the Lines: War Resistance Poetry on the American Homefront Since 1941. Poetry Criticism and Social History.  Iowa City: University of Iowa Press, 2007. ,

Poetry Chapbooks
Returning to Jaffa. Doha, Qatar: Diode Editions, 2019. 
A Concordance of Leaves. Doha, Qatar: Diode Editions, 2013. ,  Winner of 2014 Arab American Book Award.
 abu ghraib arias. Denver, CO:  Flying Guillotine Press, 2011. ,  Winner of 2012 Arab American Book Award.
 Thirty-Five New Pages. Translation. Lev Rubinstein. New York:  Ugly Duckling Presse, 2011. 
 Ode to Oil. Cleveland Heights, OH: Kattywompus Press, 2011. , 
 Instants. New York: Ugly Duckling Presse, 2006
 Primer for Non-Native Speakers. Kent, OH:  Wick Poetry Series, 2004.

Anthologies Edited
 Come Together: Imagine Peace: An Anthology of Peace Poems.  Introduction by Philip Metres.  Ed. Philip Metres, Ann Smith, and Larry Smith.  Huron, OH: Bottom Dog Press, 2008. ,

In Anthology
 Ghost Fishing: An Eco-Justice Poetry Anthology. Ed. Melissa Tuckey. University of Georgia Press, 2008. ,

Honors and awards
 Guggenheim Fellowship, Poetry, 2020
 Arab American Book Award, Non-Fiction, 2019
 Adrienne Rich Award for Poetry, 2019
 Ohio Arts Council Individual Excellence Award, Poetry, 2016
 Lyric Poetry Award, Poetry Society of America, 2016
 Lannan Literary Fellowship, 2015.
 George W. Hunt, S.J., Prize, 2015
 PEN/Heim Translation Fund Grant, 2014
 Creative Workforce Fellowship, 2014
 Ohio Arts Council Individual Excellence Award, Poetry, 2014
 National Endowment for the Arts Fellowship, 2013
 Ohio Arts Council Individual Excellence Award, Poetry, 2012
 Ohio Arts Council Individual Excellence Award, Criticism, 2012
 Massachusetts Review Anne Halley Prize for Best Poem, 2012
 Cleveland Arts Prize, Emerging Artist Award, 2010
 Ohio Arts Council Individual Excellence Award Grant, Criticism, 2009
 To See the Earth, Jury Prize for the Lit's Literary Showcase, September 2008
 "For the Fifty Who Formed PEACE With Their Bodies," First Place, Twin Cranes Peace Poem contest, 2004
 "The Doors of Vereshchagin," First Place, New Words/Akron Art Museum contest, 2004
 Ohio Arts Council Individual Excellence Award, Poetry, 2004
 Behind the Lines, International PeaceWriting Award 2002
 "Ashberries," The Best American Poetry, 2002
 National Endowment of the Arts Individual Artist Fellowship, 2001
 Ross Lockridge Jr. Award for Creative Writing, Indiana University, 2001
 Guy Lemmon Prize for Professional Writing, Indiana University, 2000
 QALAM (Arab-American Literature) Contest, First Prize, Poetry, 1999
 Thomas J. Watson Fellowship, 1992-3

References

External links 
 Philip Metres' personal website.
 Philip Metres' "Behind the Lines" blog
 Philip Metres' faculty page at John Carroll University

1970 births
American activists
American male poets
American poets
American writers of Lebanese descent
Indiana University Bloomington alumni
John Carroll University faculty
Living people
Writers from Illinois
Writers from Ohio
21st-century American poets
21st-century American translators
21st-century American male writers
Holy Cross College (Indiana) alumni